Love's Dying Wish is the second full-length studio album by Tony Harnell led heavy metal band Starbreaker, released on August 1, 2008. It is the follow-up to their self-titled debut album from 2005.

The line-up on this album is the same except Jonni Lightfoot who replaced Fabrizio Grossi on bass. Tony Harnell has stated in an interview that "the album is a lot more aggressive than the first one".

Track listing
 "End of Alone" - 4:24
 "Evaporate" - 4:00
 "Love's Dying Wish" - 4:07
 "Unknown Superstar" - 4:24
 "Hide" - 4:18
 "Building a Wall" - 4:33
 "Beautiful Disaster" - 4:09
 "Live Your Life" - 4:00
 "Hello, Are You Listening?" - 3:54
 "Changes Me" - 4:41
 "The Day Belongs to Us" - 4:41
 "This Close" - 5:06

Personnel
Tony Harnell - lead vocals
Magnus Karlsson - guitars, keyboards, piano
Jonni Lightfoot - bass
John Macaluso - drums, percussion

2008 albums
Starbreaker (band) albums
Frontiers Records albums